Marketo, Inc. is an American software company, headquartered in San Mateo, California. Marketo develops and sells marketing automation software for account-based marketing and other marketing services and products, including SEO and content creation.

In 2018, Marketo was acquired by Adobe Inc.

History

2006–11: The founding of Marketo 
Phil Fernandez, Jon Miller, and David Morandi, all formerly of Epiphany, sought to help chief marketing officers and their teams to demonstrate the return on investment of their marketing programs. In 2006, they founded Marketo.

Marketo introduced its first product, Marketo Lead Management, in 2008 followed by Marketo Sales Insight in 2009 and Marketo Revenue Cycle Analytics in 2010.

2012–18: Marketo Acquisitions 
In April 2012, Marketo completed its first acquisition by acquiring Crowd Factory, which enabled the company to integrate social media marketing capabilities into its application suite. In November 2012, Marketo introduced LaunchPoint, an app and services network for the “marketing nation” of technology partners and professional service providers.

By 2013, Marketo filed for initial public offering and went public on May 17, 2013. In December 2013, Marketo acquired Insightera, an Israeli company specializing in website personalization, for $20 million in cash and stock.

In June 2016, Vista Equity Partners announced an agreement to acquire Marketo for approximately $1.79 billion, and the acquisition completed in August 2017. Steve Lucas was named the new chief executive officer of Marketo in October 2016. In 2017, Marketo was named as a leader in the Gartner Magic Quadrant for CRM Lead Management for the sixth year in a row. In August 2017, Marketo announced that it will move all of its marketing automation software onto Google Cloud Platform as part of a six-year partnership to integrate Google's tools into Marketo's products; however, this was paused in 2019. While not officially abandoned, no further move of services to Google has occurred, and in fact, many migrated services have been brought back in-house.

On September 20, 2018, Adobe Systems announced that it was buying Marketo for $4.75 billion.

Awards and honors
Inc. 500 2012 (rank: 78) 
Forbes Most Promising Companies 2011 (rank: 28) 
CRM Market Leaders Awards 2012, winner, Marketing Solutions 
Wall Street Journal Next Big Thing 2012 (rank: 20) 
AppExchange Customer Choice Awards 2012, winner, Marketing 
CODiE Awards 2012, winner, Best Marketing/Public Relations Solution 
Best in Biz 2012 EMEA Awards, Small or Medium Business Product of the Year (silver) 
SLMA 50 Most Influential, winner, Marketo CEO Steve Lucas 
Inc. Hire Power List 2012 (rank: 5)
Gartner Magic Quadrant for CRM Lead Management 2017

References

External links
Marketo, Inc.

2006 establishments in California
Software companies established in 2006
American companies established in 2006
Companies based in San Mateo, California
Email marketing software
Marketing software
Software companies based in the San Francisco Bay Area
2013 initial public offerings
2017 mergers and acquisitions
2018 mergers and acquisitions
Companies formerly listed on the Nasdaq
Adobe Inc.
Defunct software companies of the United States